Phibalapteryx virgata, the oblique striped, is a moth of the family Geometridae. The species was first described by Johann Siegfried Hufnagel in 1767 and it is found throughout Europe.

The length of the forewings is 22–25 mm. The moth resembles Orthonama vittata, but has a lighter colour. The moth flies in two or three generations from April to September .

The larva mainly feeds on lady's bedstraw.

Notes
 The flight season refers to Belgium and the Netherlands. This may vary in other parts of the range.

External links

 Lepiforum e.V.
 Fauna Europaea
 UKMoths

Cataclysmiini
Moths of Europe
Moths of Asia
Taxa named by Johann Siegfried Hufnagel